Siempre Hay Un Mañana is an EP a 45" LP (Single) album by Mexican pop singer Yuri. It was released in 1979. Officially, this is not considered an album, these 2 songs were adrift, so they were released as an EP.  "Siempre hay un mañana" is a cover of a Donna Summer's song.

Track listing 

1979 EPs
Yuri (Mexican singer) albums